The 1952 NCAA Wrestling Championships were the 22nd NCAA Wrestling Championships to be held. Colorado A&M in Fort Collins, Colorado hosted the tournament at their South College Gymnasium.

Oklahoma took home the team championship with 22 points and having two individual champions.

Tommy Evans of Oklahoma was named the Most Outstanding Wrestler.

Team results

Individual finals

References 

NCAA Division I Wrestling Championship
Wrestling competitions in the United States
NCAA Wrestling Championships
NCAA Wrestling Championships
NCAA Wrestling Championships
Wrestling in Colorado